Junki Itō (伊藤 準規, born January 7, 1991) is a Japanese former professional baseball pitcher. He has played in Nippon Professional Baseball (NPB) for the Chunichi Dragons.

Career

On September 30, 2009, Itō made his NPB debut.

On December 2, 2020, he become a free agent. On December 8, 2020, he announced his retirement.

References

External links

1991 births
Living people
Baseball people from Aichi Prefecture
Chunichi Dragons players
Japanese baseball players
Nippon Professional Baseball pitchers
People from Inazawa